Taunggyi Stadium is a multi-use stadium in Taunggyi, Myanmar.  It is currently used mostly for football matches and is the home ground of Shan United F.C. of the Myanmar National League.  The stadium has a capacity of 7,000 spectators.

External links
 Stadium information

Football venues in Myanmar
Sports venues completed in 2012